Kazhumaram is a 1982 Indian Malayalam film, directed by A. B. Raj and starring Sukumaran, Sumalatha, Sukumari and Balan K. Nair. The film has a musical score by Shankar–Ganesh.

Cast
Sukumaran
Sumalatha
Sukumari
Balan K. Nair
Kottarakkara Sreedharan Nair
Uma Bharani

Soundtrack
The music was composed by Shankar–Ganesh and the lyrics were written by Bichu Thirumala.

References

External links
 

1982 films
1980s Malayalam-language films
Films scored by Shankar–Ganesh
Films directed by A. B. Raj